Sallirmiutun (formerly Siglitun) is the dialect of Inuvialuktun spoken by the Siglit, an Inuit group of the Northwest Territories, Canada. It is mainly used in the Inuvialuit communities of Paulatuk, Sachs Harbour and Tuktoyaktuk. Sallirmiutun was once the principal dialect of the Mackenzie River delta, nearby parts of the coast and Arctic Ocean islands, but the number of speakers fell dramatically following outbreaks of new diseases in the 19th century and for many years Sallirmiutun  was believed to be completely extinct. It was only in the 1980s that outsiders realised that it was still spoken.

Sallirmiutun means "the language of the people of the coast" referring to the Beaufort Sea. It is the original dialect of the people from Kitigaaryuit.

It is one of the three dialects, along with Kangiryuarmiutun and Uummarmiutun, of Inuit language grouped together under the label Inuvialuktun. In fact, the word Inuvialuktun, meaning "the language of the real people" is a Sallirmiutun dialect word.

Phonology 

The following is the phonology of the Siglitun dialect:

Vowels 

 Vowel sounds /i u/ can have allophones heard as [ ].

Consonants

Vocabulary comparison 
The comparison of some animal names in the Siglitun dialect of Inuvialuktun language and Uummarmiutun dialect of the Iñupiatun language:

References 

Agglutinative languages
Inuvialuit languages
Indigenous languages of the North American Arctic
Inuktitut words and phrases